Andrew James Snowden (born October 1984) is a British Conservative politician and was elected Lancashire Police and Crime Commissioner in the 2021 election held on 6 May.  He received 181,314 votes (51.3%) in total, defeating the incumbent, Labour's Clive Grunshaw.

He was previously a member of Lancashire County Council representing Hoghton with Wheelton ward in the borough of Chorley.

He was born in Bolton and lives in Chorley. He has a degree in contemporary military and international history (2008) from the University of Salford, where he was president of the students' union in 2006-2007 and 2007-2008. He returned to the university in 2013 to take up the post of head of the Vice-Chancellor's office, and in 2018 became the associate director of external relations.

References

External links
Candidate page at "Choose my PCC"
 Police Commissioner website

1984 births
Living people
Conservative Party (UK) politicians
Police and crime commissioners in England
Conservative Party police and crime commissioners
Alumni of the University of Salford